Aurions-Idernes is a commune in the Pyrénées-Atlantiques department in the Nouvelle-Aquitaine region of south-western France.

The inhabitants of the commune are known as Aurionais or Aurionaises.

Geography
Aurions-Idernes is located approximately 50 km north-east of Pau and 12 km north-west of Maubourguet. Access to the commune is by the D205 road from Séméacq-Blachon in the south, which passes through the length of the commune on the eastern side and continues north to join the D317. Access to the village is by the D219 road from Arrosès in the east which passes through the village and continues south-west to join the D13 near Cadillon. The commune is mainly farmland with some forested areas.

The Larcis river forms most of the eastern border of the commune as it flows north to join the Lées east of Ségos. Several unnamed tributaries rise in the commune and flow east to join the Larcis.

Places and Hamlets

 L'Abbat
 Aurions
 Les Barsious
 Biau
 Bitaillou
 Bouché
 Cassou
 Clocq
 Crampilh
 Dumas
 Farandou
 Froment
 Hourcadet
 Idernes
 Labatte
 Lafitau
 Lafontaa
 Lahaille
 Larribau
 Pin
 Poublan
 Pouchan
 Sy
 Le Tétour

Neighbouring communes and villages

Toponymy
The commune name in béarnais is Aurions-Idèrnas. Michel Grosclaude indicated that Aurions is probably from the Latin man's name Aurius with the suffix -onis giving "Domain of Aurius". The origin of the name Idernes however remains obscure.

The following table details the origins of the commune name and other names in the commune.

Sources:

Raymond: Topographic Dictionary of the Department of Basses-Pyrenees, 1863, on the page numbers indicated in the table. 
Grosclaude: Toponymic Dictionary of communes, Béarn, 2006 
Cassini: Cassini Map from 1750

Origins:

Marca: Pierre de Marca, History of Béarn.
Census: Census of Béarn
Reformation: Reformation of Béarn
Establishments: Register of Establishments of Béarn
Aurions: Terrier of Aurions.

History
Paul Raymond noted on  page 17 of the 1863 dictionary that in 1385 Aurions and Idernes depended on the bailiwick of Lembeye and respectively had 11 and 13 fires.

Idernes was merged with Aurions in 1844. In 1846 the commune, which had been part of the Canton of Garlin, changed to be part of the Canton of Lembeye.

Administration

List of Successive Mayors

Inter-communality
The commune is part of five inter-communal structures:
 the Communauté de communes du Nord-Est Béarn;
 the SIVU for Highways in the Canton of Lembeye;
 the SIVU for the educational grouping of Aurions-Idernes, Arrosès, Séméacq-Blachon, and Moncaup;
 the Energy association of Pyrénées-Atlantiques;
 the inter-communal association for the management of drinking water (SIAEP) of Vic-Bilh Montanérès;

Demography
In 2017 the commune had 104 inhabitants.

Economy
The commune is part of the appellation d'origine contrôlée (AOC) zones of Madiran, Pacherenc-du-vic-bilh, and Béarn.

Culture and heritage

Civil heritage
The commune has a number of buildings and structures that are registered as historical monuments:
Houses and Farms
Fortified Buildings at Aurions-Barsious (Late Middle Ages)
Fortified Buildings at Aurions-le-Tétour (Late Middle Ages)

Religious heritage

The commune has several religious buildings and structures that are registered as historical monuments:
The Parish Church of Saint Pierre of Aurions (12th century) The Church contains many items that are registered as historical objects:
A Wayside Cross (19th century)
2 tablecloths for the choir enclosure (19th century)
A Pulpit (18th century)
An Altar, altar seating, Tabernacle, and a statue (19th century)
4 Altar candlesticks (19th century)
A Painting: Christ on the Cross with the Virgin (19th century)
A Retable (18th century)
A Tabernacle (18th century)
Altar seating (18th century)
The Main Altar with seating, Tabernacle, Retable, and 4 candlesticks (18th century)
The Main Altar (19th century)

Church Picture Gallery

Facilities
The commune has a nursery school.

See also
Communes of the Pyrénées-Atlantiques department

References

External links
Aurions-Idernes on Géoportail, National Geographic Institute (IGN) website 
Aurious and Jderne on the 1750 Cassini Map

Communes of Pyrénées-Atlantiques